Adysângela Moniz (born 9 May 1987 in Ilha de Santiago, Cape Verde) is a Cape Verdean judoka. She competed at the 2012 Summer Olympics in the Women +78kg event. She was also the flag bearer for Cape Verde at the opening ceremony.

References

External links 
 
 
 

1987 births
Living people
Cape Verdean female judoka
Judoka at the 2012 Summer Olympics
Olympic judoka of Cape Verde